Movie Insider is a website offering behind-the-scenes film information about upcoming Hollywood releases. Visitors can access daily movie news updates and informational profiles of films in early stages of development and pre-production. Originally started as a relatively small online publication, the site has exponentially grown to more than 1.1 million visitors monthly.

See also
 AICN
 Cinema Blend
 Dark Horizons
 JoBlo
 ShowBIZ Data

References

External links

Internet properties established in 1999
American film websites
1999 establishments in the United States